Steven George Kiefer (born October 18, 1960) is an American former professional baseball third baseman. He played in Major League Baseball (MLB) from 1984 to 1989 for the Oakland Athletics, Milwaukee Brewers, and New York Yankees. Most of his career-best totals were set in 1987 while playing for the Brewers.

Steve's brother is former major league pitcher Mark Kiefer.

References

1960 births
Living people
Albany A's players
American expatriate baseball players in Canada
Baseball players from Chicago
Buffalo Bisons (minor league) players
Columbus Clippers players
Denver Zephyrs players
Fullerton College alumni
Fullerton Hornets baseball players
Madison Muskies players
Major League Baseball third basemen
Medford A's players
Milwaukee Brewers players
New York Yankees players
Oakland Athletics players
Tacoma Tigers players
Tidewater Tides players
Tigres de Aragua players
American expatriate baseball players in Venezuela
Vancouver Canadians players